This article lists all of the local over-the-air television stations in the United States that are carried in Canada via cable/digital cable or satellite. This list also includes stations that were formerly carried, but have since been dropped. Some of the stations listed also have their over-the-air signal overlapping major cities in Canada; a few are also available over-the-air only in Canada.

The stations are organized by market, starting in the east (Maine) and ending in the west (California). Not all stations are available in all areas. A station that has the word "bumped" next to it means that the station has been replaced by one of the stations from the CANCOM services, most likely either a Buffalo or Detroit local station in the east, or a Spokane or Seattle local station in the west.

American over-the-air services distributed locally

These channels appear on certain cable systems in Canada. However, the CRTC has not authorized their distribution outside of the areas in which these channels can be picked up over-the-air; hence, they are not available for national distribution. There are other American stations available in Canada near the American border, but they are only available over-the-air and are not carried on any cable system.
 FOX:
 WJBK Detroit (available in Windsor/Sarnia/Chatham-Kent; available on Cogeco cable in Windsor area)
 KMSP-TV Minneapolis (available in Thunder Bay)
 WAGM-DT2 Presque Isle (available in Northwestern New Brunswick)
 WFXT-TV Boston (serves most of Atlantic Canada by Cable and fiber providers)
 CBS:
 WAGM-TV Presque Isle (available in Northwestern New Brunswick)
 WOIO Cleveland (available in St. Thomas)
 WCCO-TV Minneapolis (available in Thunder Bay)
 ABC:
 WDAZ-TV Grand Forks (available in Winnipeg)
 KSTP-TV Minneapolis (available in Thunder Bay)
 KOMO-TV Seattle (available in British Columbia and Atlantic Canada)
 WCVB-TV Boston (available in Atlantic Canada)
 The CW:
 WKBD-TV Detroit (available in Windsor/Sarnia/Chatham-Kent)
 WNLO Buffalo (available in Southern Ontario)
 KSTW Tacoma (available in Vancouver/Southern British Columbia and Vancouver Island)
 WUAB Cleveland (available in London)
 Me-TV:
 KVOS-TV Bellingham (available in Vancouver/Southern British Columbia and Vancouver Island)
 MyNetworkTV:
 WNYO-TV Buffalo (available in Southern Ontario)
 PBS:
 WMED-TV (available in New Brunswick)
 KFME-TV Fargo (available in Winnipeg/Northwestern Ontario in high-definition)
 KGFE-TV Grand Forks (available in Winnipeg)
 KTCI Minneapolis (available in Thunder Bay)
 WCFE-TV Plattsburgh (available in Montreal
 WPBS-TV Watertown (available in Ottawa)
 WNED-TV Buffalo (available in Southern Ontario)
 WQLN-TV Erie (available in London)
 Independent:
 WMYD Detroit (available in Windsor/Sarnia/Chatham-Kent)

Superstations 
These stations are listed as superstations, and are carried on many if not most or all cable and satellite systems in Canada.

Shaw Broadcast Services / nationwide coverage 
Seattle and Detroit stations are carried via Shaw Broadcast Services, and are available nationwide to Shaw Direct customers and domestic cable TV operators, as well as to some Northern United States communities.

Shaw has announced its intention to drop all Buffalo feeds and coverage of Detroit Fox O&O WJBK, effective end of April 2009.

Bell TV / nationwide coverage 
Bell Satellite TV carries Boston and Seattle local stations nationally.

Bell carries many Seattle related television stations.

Other stations / local coverage 
These other stations are not carried nationally, and may only be available in a certain region or even a few towns. Some stations are available over-the-air only.

Eastern Canada 
These stations are carried in the Atlantic Canadian provinces of New Brunswick, Prince Edward Island, Nova Scotia, and Newfoundland and Labrador, across many cable systems.

Province of Quebec, Cornwall/Hawkesbury Ontario 
These stations are available to cable and satellite customers in Quebec City, Sherbrooke, and Montreal.

Eastern Ontario 
These stations are or were carried in the National Capital Region, Pembroke, Ontario, Ottawa, and Kingston, Ontario. This region also includes Peterborough, Ontario, and towns along the northern shore of Lake Ontario.

Southern Ontario 
These stations are carried throughout the Greater Toronto Area and Golden Horseshoe on a variety of cable systems.

London, Ontario 
These stations are carried in the London and St. Thomas area.

Windsor, Ontario/Chatham, Ontario 

These stations are or were carried in the Windsor, Ontario market, serving Windsor, Essex County, Leamington, Ontario, Chatham-Kent, Ontario, Lambton County and even parts of Middlesex County and Elgin County. Also refer to CRTC decisions archive for details on the Windsor/Leamington-area cable listings.

Northeastern Ontario 
These stations are or were carried in Northern Ontario, including Sault Ste. Marie, Ontario.

Northwestern Ontario, Manitoba and Saskatchewan 
These stations are carried throughout cities and towns in Northwestern Ontario, Manitoba, and in Saskatchewan.

Edmonton Capital Region/Calgary Region of Alberta

Yukon, Northwest Territories, and Nunavut 
These stations are carried throughout cities in Yukon, Northwest Territories, and Nunavut

Lower Mainland/Vancouver Island of British Columbia 
These stations are carried throughout the Lower Mainland of British Columbia, including Vancouver, Victoria, and the Lower Fraser Valley.

Further information

See also 
 List of television stations in Canada
 List of Canadian television networks
 List of Canadian television channels
 List of Canadian specialty channels
 Category A services
 Category B services
 Category C services
 List of foreign television channels available in Canada
 Digital television in Canada
 Multichannel television in Canada
 List of Canadian television stations available in the United States
 List of television stations in North America by media market

References

External links 
 CRTC's list of available cable and satellite television channels, including over-the-air network affiliates
 CRTC's decision on Cogeco's channel lineup proposals

United States stations available in Canada
United States stations available in Canada
Television Canada